Alborea is a municipality in Albacete, Castile-La Mancha, Spain. It has a population of 870.

See also
Manchuela

References

External links
Unofficial web site of Alborea
Alborea - Web de la Diputación

Municipalities of the Province of Albacete